The 2002–03 season was the 101st in the history of the Western Football League.

The league champions for the first time in their history were Team Bath, who were promoted to the Southern League. The champions of Division One were Torrington.

Final tables

Premier Division
The Premier Division was reduced from 20 to 18 clubs after Taunton Town were promoted to the Southern League, Bristol Manor Farm and Westbury United were relegated to the First Division, and Yeovil Town Reserves also left. Two clubs joined:

Bath City Reserves, runners-up in the First Division.
Frome Town, champions of the First Division.

First Division
The First Division was reduced from 20 to 19 clubs after Frome Town and Bath City Reserves were promoted to the Premier Division, Warminster Town were relegated to the Wiltshire League, and two clubs joined:

Bristol Manor Farm, relegated from the Premier Division.
Westbury United, relegated from the Premier Division.

References

2002-03
8